Aylesbury High Street railway station was the London and North Western Railway station which served the  town of Aylesbury in the English county of Buckinghamshire. It was the terminus of a branch from Cheddington on what is now known as the West Coast Main Line running to London Euston and to Birmingham New Street and further north.

Two stations were built, the first being used as a goods terminus after its closure to passengers.

History
The first station at Aylesbury was opened by the Aylesbury Railway on 10 June 1839; this was closed on 16 June 1889 when it was replaced by the second station, also named Aylesbury. The line was operated by the London and Birmingham Railway, and when that company amalgamated with others to form the London and North Western Railway (LNWR), the Aylesbury Railway was absorbed by the LNWR. The LNWR became part of the London Midland and Scottish Railway during the Grouping of 1923, passing on to the London Midland Region of British Railways during the nationalisation of 1948. British Railways (BR) renamed the station Aylesbury High Street on 25 September 1950; it was then closed to passengers on 2 February 1953 and then freight on 2 December 1963.

Routes
The only intermediate station between Aylesbury and Cheddington was at Marston Gate.

The site today
The site is now occupied by an office block and a retail park. The route into Aylesbury has been taken over by a road named 'Stocklake' and 'Vale Park Drive' (part of the A418 road), although the formation remains mostly intact along the route of the road. 
During the summer of 2015 trees and vegetation were cleared from the formation in preparation for the construction of a new Stocklake (urban) road. On Monday 18 January 2016, contractors began work on the new road, which will use the trackbed of the old railway to link Park Street with Douglas Road, Aylesbury, parallel to the existing road. This will be converted into a new service road for homes and businesses, providing more parking and easier access.

References

Sources
 
 
 
 Station on navigable O.S. map

Former London and North Western Railway stations
Disused railway stations in Buckinghamshire
Railway stations in Great Britain opened in 1839
Railway stations in Great Britain closed in 1963